The var, in Punjabi poetry, is a heroic ode or ballad which generally narrates legend such as stories of Punjabi folk heroes or a historical event. Examples include the feats of Dulla Bhatti Raja Rasalu, Amir Khusrau's Var for Ghazi Malik who took the throne of Delhi in 1320, the Vaar of Shaikha Khokhar, and Najabat's Nadar Shah Di Var which describes the invasion of India by Nadir Shah in 1739. The Var has also been used to evoke the mood of devotion or sacrifice, as in Guru Gobind Singh's Chandi di Var, or to narrate the mystical experience of a Pir, Bhagat or Guru.

See also
 Dhadi (music)
 Raga
 Asa di Var
 Chandi di Var
 Varan Bhai Gurdas

References
 

Punjabi literature